Guangxi Pingguo Haliao Football Club is a professional Chinese football club that currently participates in the China League Two. The team is based in Pingguo, Baise, Guangxi.

History
On February 27, 2018, the club was founded by Baoyun Real Estate Development Co. in Liuzhou as Guangxi Baoyun F.C.. Participating in the provincial Guangxi Super League for its first time, the club managed to win the entire championship by beating Liuzhou Ranko in the finals, and secured a spot in the 2018 Chinese Champions League. In this new conquest, they finished 2nd in the group stage, and advanced to the final play-off stage, facing the giant of the league Chengdu Better City in the round of 16. After two hard-fought battles, although eventually losing 1–4 in Chengdu and facing elimination, the team managed to hold their ground at the home game and upset the guests with a 0–0 draw, which led to them achieving the rank of 13th out of 16 teams, just above Shenzhen Xinqiao and Qingdao Red Lions which lost their both two rounds of games—a rank eligible for admission to 2019 China League Two due to vacancies created by the withdrawal of several teams. They were eventually granted promotion on Feb 1st, 2019.

Before the 2021 China League Two season, the club moved to Pingguo and changed its name to Guangxi Pingguo Haliao F.C.

Players

Current squad

Coaching staff

Managerial history
  Han Zhenyuan (2018)
  Wang Jung-hyun (2018–2019)
  Pei Encai (2019)
  Yang Lin (2019)
  Zhao Changhong (2020-2021)
  Yang Lin (2021-)

Results
All-time league rankings

As of the end of 2022 season.

Key

 Pld = Played
 W = Games won
 D = Games drawn
 L = Games lost
 F = Goals for
 A = Goals against
 Pts = Points
 Pos = Final position

 DNQ = Did Not Qualify
 DNE = Did Not Enter
 NH = Not Held
 WD = Withdrawal
 – = Does Not Exist
 R1 = Round 1
 R2 = Round 2
 R3 = Round 3
 R4 = Round 4

 F = Final
 SF = Semi-finals
 QF = Quarter-finals
 R16 = Round of 16
 Group = Group stage
 GS2 = Second Group stage
 QR1 = First Qualifying Round
 QR2 = Second Qualifying Round
 QR3 = Third Qualifying Round

References

Football clubs in China
Sport in Guangxi
Guangxi Pingguo Haliao F.C.